Nicolas Chaix, also known by his  alias I:Cube, is a French DJ and an electronic music producer.

Paris based, he first gained limelight on Paris' underground dance scene in the mid to late 1990s, most notably through his remix of "Around The World" by Daft Punk in 1997. Daft Punk had remixed one of his titles, "Disco Cubizm", in 1996.

In 1997, I:Cube released his first album, Picnic Attack.

His music appears on many compilation albums such as the Hotel Costes series.

Château Flight 
In 1996, DJ Gilb'R, who then a programmer at Radio Nova, received a demo cassette from I:Cube. Gilb'R was impressed, so he made him the first artist of his newly created label, Versatile. By 1997, Versatile had released several of I:Cube's records. Chaix and Cohen eventually began to collaborate as Château Flight.  Their first album, Puzzle was released by Versatile on October 30, 2001.

Discography

As I:Cube 
1997 - Picnic Attack
1999 - Adore
2003 - 3
2006 - Live At The Planetarium
2012 - "M" Mega mix
2018 - Double Pack

With Château Flight

Albums 
2000 - Puzzle
2002 - Crash Test (with La Caution)
2004 - Remix
2006 - Les Vampires (Original Soundtrack)

References

External links
RBMA Radio On Demand - Train Wreck Mix - I:Cube (Versatile, Paris)

French dance musicians
French house musicians
French record producers
Living people
Remixers
Year of birth missing (living people)